Leoš Čermák (born 13 March 1978 in Třebíč) is a Czech professional ice hockey player currently playing for Torpedo Nizhny Novgorod in the Kontinental Hockey League.

Čermák began playing for HC Slavia Prague in the Czech Extraliga and then for HC Vítkovice before spending a season in the Russian Hockey League for Sibir Novosibirsk. He returned to the Czech Republic and split the next few years with Slavia Prague and HC Bílí Tygři Liberec. In 2008, Čermák returned to Russia and signed for Salavat Yulaev Ufa of the newly created KHL. He was released by the Ufa at the end of the 2008–09 season and signed a contract with Sibir Novosibirsk, where he started his career in Russia.

External links

1978 births
Czech ice hockey right wingers
Czech expatriate ice hockey players in Russia
Living people
HC Bílí Tygři Liberec players
HC Sibir Novosibirsk players
HC Slavia Praha players
HC Vítkovice players
Salavat Yulaev Ufa players
Sportspeople from Třebíč
Torpedo Nizhny Novgorod players